KBID-LD, virtual channel 31 (UHF digital channel 24), is a low-powered Al Jazeera-affiliated television station licensed to Fresno, California, United States. The station is owned by Ventura Broadcasting.

Digital television 
The station's digital signal is multiplexed:

References

BID-LP
Low-power television stations in the United States